The Ratio Institute is an independent Swedish research institute focusing on the conditions for enterprise, entrepreneurship and market economy and political change. The institute's infrastructure is financed by the Confederation of Swedish Enterprise, but various research projects have financiers like the Wallenberg Foundation.

Ratio was established as a publishing house within the think tank Timbro (a subsidiary of the Swedish Free Enterprise Foundation) in 1978. The Ratio institute was founded in 2002, and formed as a non-profit organisation in 2004.

Ratio's Scientific Advisory Board includes Deirdre McCloskey and Daniel B. Klein.

References

External links
 

2002 establishments in Sweden
Think tanks established in 2002
Research institutes in Sweden
Think tanks based in Sweden
Political and economic think tanks based in the European Union